Ho Teaching Hospital formerly Volta Regional Hospital and popularly known as Trafalgar is the regional and teaching hospital in Ho in the Volta Region of Ghana. It was the main referral facility in the Volta Region until it was upgraded to a teaching hospital in 2019 to serve the University of Health and Allied Sciences. It was commissioned as a Teaching Hospital by the Minister of Health, Hon. Kwaku Agyemang Manu on 29 April 2019 after the Hospital went through strenuous accreditation process by all the Health Professional Regulatory Bodies and the Health Facilities Regulatory Authority in Ghana.

Directorates 
The facility has seven (7) directorates that help the facility achieve its vision of becoming "The Premium Hospital in Innovative Tertiary Health Care, Medical Education and Research"

 Medical Affairs
 Administration & Support Services
 Nursing Administration
 Human Resources
 Research, Innovation, Planning, Monitoring and Evaluation
 Finance
 Pharmacy

Clinical departments 
 Internal Medicine
 Surgical
 Obstetrics & Gynaecology
 Child Health
 Public health

See also
 List of hospitals in the Volta Region

References

Hospitals in Ghana